Ellen Ryan (born 1997) is a female Australian international lawn and indoor bowler.

Bowls career
Ryan made her international debut during the 2017 Australia v England Test Series and won the Australian Open singles and pairs gold medal in 2017. She was the first person to hold both the indoor and outdoor world under-25 singles titles simultaneously.

In 2018, Ryan won the Hong Kong International Bowls Classic pairs title with Natasha Scott. The following year in 2019, she won the Australian National Bowls Championships fours.

In 2020 Ryan was selected for the 2020 World Outdoor Bowls Championship in Australia.

In 2022, Ryan competed in the women's singles and the women's pairs at the 2022 Commonwealth Games in Birmingham. In the singles event, Ryan won the gold medal, defeating Lucy Beere in the final by 21 shots to 17. In the pairs with Kristina Krstic, she secured the double gold.

Awards
Ryan was awarded the 2017 Young Player of the Year by the World Bowls Tour.

References

1997 births
Living people
Australian female bowls players
21st-century Australian women
Bowls players at the 2022 Commonwealth Games
Commonwealth Games gold medallists for Australia
Commonwealth Games medallists in lawn bowls
Medallists at the 2022 Commonwealth Games